Yujiulü Cheluhui was ruler and tribal chief of the Rourans, succeeded Mùgǔlǘ (Mugului) and was the son of the same, his year of birth is unknown. He was a rough man and his government was marked by nomadism and peace.

Government

Migration and peace 
He gathered his Rouran subordinates. During their reign, the Rourans did not fight, they wandered peacefully, crossing the Gobi Desert like nomads in the winter and moved south and returned north in the summer to live. Rouran was a nomadic country. Although they established the tribe, they still belonged to Tuoba Wei and Xianbei and contributed to them with skins and horses.

Heroism and the "tribal meeting" 
After Mugulü's death, his son Cheluhui, noted for being heroic and vigorous, gather the multitude into a tribal confederation, whose self-name was "Rouran", later derisively changed to "Ruru" ~ "Ruanruan" by Emperor Taiwu of Northern Wei, who considered them ignorant and worm-like in appearance. The Yujiulü family began to have a group of people, self-commanding and self-proclaimed Rouran. Later, he would be succeeded by his son, Tunugui, son of Cheluhui and grandson of Mugulü.

See also 

 Yujiulü Mugulü

Bibliography

Primary Sources 
 "Book of Wei" (Volume 103 - Account 91) (in Chinese)
 "History of the Northern Dynasties" (Volume 98 - Account 86) (in Chinese)

References 

 

Khagans of the Rouran
History of Mongolia
Xianbei